Lekarzewice  is a village in the administrative district of Gmina Osięciny, within Radziejów County, Kuyavian-Pomeranian Voivodeship, in north-central Poland.
Wiktoria Wozniaka, mère de Wladislaw KLAWCZYNSKI y est née le 15 février 1863.

References

Lekarzewice